The Silver Shell for Best Director  is one of the main awards presented at the San Sebastián Film Festival to the director of a competing film.

Award winners

See also 

 Golden Shell for Best Film
 Silver Shell for Best Actress
Silver Shell for Best Actor
 Donostia Award
 Sebastiane Award

References

External links 

Official website
SSIFF Award Archive

San Sebastián International Film Festival
Spanish film awards
Lists of films by award
International film awards